Malcolm Yates ( – 15 February 1997) was an English rugby league footballer who played as a . Yates began his career at his home town club Leigh and went on to play for Salford and Warrington. He also won representative honours with Lancashire.

Background
Yates was born in Leigh, Lancashire, England.

Career
Yates started his rugby league career with Leigh. In November 1980, he was signed by Salford for a fee of £10,000. In September 1983, he was signed by Warrington for a fee of £10,000.

References

1950s births
1997 deaths
English rugby league players
Lancashire rugby league team players
Leigh Leopards players
Publicans
Rugby league players from Leigh, Greater Manchester
Rugby league props
Salford Red Devils players
Warrington Wolves players